USS Arethusa may refer to the following ships of the United States Navy:

 , a collier for the Union Navy in the American Civil War.
 , a fleet oiler for the Navy in World War I.
 , a mobile floating tanker for the Navy in World War II.

See also
 

United States Navy ship names